Drew Rokos is an Australian comedian who won both the 2000 Melbourne International Comedy Festival's Raw Comedy competition and the Edinburgh Comedy Festival's So You Think You're Funny competition.

References

Australian male comedians
Living people
Year of birth missing (living people)
Place of birth missing (living people)